Wolaita Sodo University is a public university in Wolaita Sodo, South West Ethiopia Peoples' Region, Ethiopia. It is approximately 339 kilometers (210.65 mile) far from Addis Ababa, Ethiopia in southwest direction. It is one of the second generation universities of Ethiopia. The foundation stone of the university laid by Prime Minister Meles Zenawi. The university has three campuses: Gandaba Campus, Otona Campus and Tercha Campus. Ministry of Science and Higher Education of Ethiopian categorized the university under applied institutions.

Wolaita Sodo University has 58 undergraduate programs, 43 postgraduate programs, 6 Doctor of Philosophy programs, and 4 Medical specialty programs.

History 
Wolaita Sodo University was established on 24 March 2007 by proclamation. The university started its duty with 16 undergraduate programs and 807 students. Now over 35,000 active students; until 2019 the university has graduated 57,188 students. There are 1,626 Academic, and 3,770 Administrative staff.

Colleges and Schools 

The university has three schools namely, School of Informatics, School of Veterinary Medicine and School of Law.

Community services 
The university has been involved in community service activities by designing problem solving projects that can ensure the benefit of the community in various fields and based on questions from the community. One of the 87 community service projects approved in 2019 is the digging of deep water wells in Wolayita Zone, Sodo, Bodit, Gununo and Bele towns.

Gununo 
According to Dr. Mesfin Bibiso, Vice President for Research and Community Service and Associate Deans of Colleges and Schools, experts have proved that the deep well drilling carried out with the support of the community service project is effective and generates 16 liters of water per second, or 1,382,000 liter per day. He said that the previous water supply in the town was 5 liters per second, which is very limited in terms of the city's population, adding that it has been put in place to alleviate the problems of the community.

According to experts, the project, which was implemented in Gununo town on Thursday, 1 October 2020 generates 1,382,000 liters of water per day and will be accessible to more than 130,000 households.

As the university stated its "the project is expected to be implemented in Sodo, Boditi and Bale towns of the zone soon".

Notable alumni 
 Professor Takele Tadesse president of the university
 Samuel Urkato, former president of the university

See also 
 List of universities and colleges in Ethiopia

References 

Universities and colleges in Southern Nations, Nationalities, and Peoples' Region
2007 establishments in Ethiopia
Educational institutions established in 2007
Second-generation universities of Ethiopia
Sodo